"Jaloux" is a song by French singer Dadju. It was released on 5 October 2018, alongside its music video.

Charts

Weekly charts

Year-end charts

Certifications

References

2018 singles
2018 songs
Dadju songs
French-language songs